Matthew Arthur Bardock was born in 1969 in Croydon. He is an English actor who is known for playing Jeff Collier in Casualty, DS Clive Barnard in A Touch of Frost, DS Davey Higgins in The Coroner, Albie in The Lakes, Mark Craig in New Blood and DS Simon Morgan in Manhunt: The Nightstalker.

Career
Bardock made his television debut in 1992, when he appeared in Prime Suspect and the following year, he appeared in Casualty as a leading gang member who set fire to the ED. In 1995, Bardock appeared in the stage production of Mojo by Jez Butterworth at the Royal Court Theatre.

Bardock came to notice for his role as DC Clive Barnard in the British television series A Touch of Frost. His character was the nephew of the Chief Constable. While many believe he had only got into CID through his family connections, Frost sees beyond that and takes Barnard under his wing. He was later promoted to Detective Sergeant, but was killed in the 1997 episode "No Other Love". July and August 2000 saw Bardock play the role of Danny Weir in the short-lived TV comedy Pay and Display.

Bardock also appeared as murder suspect Scott Burnett in The Bill in 2004. His character was developed and he began a relationship with PC Honey Harman and later married her, though the marriage was short-lived after it was discovered that he had murdered his first wife. His character later died in prison having hanged himself. He also appeared in Prime Suspect as the sadistic pornographer Jason Reynolds as well as the Channel 4 series No Angels, in which he played registrar Peter Compton. Bardock had a small part in ITV's Midsomer Murders and in May 2005, he played DI Tom Wilson in New Tricks.

Bardock re-joined the BBC television series Casualty as paramedic Jeff Collier in February 2007 for three months, before returning to the programme in September of that year. On 30 June 2014, it was announced that Bardock would be leaving his role as Jeff – a role he played for seven years – and he was killed off in October that year.

Between 31 July and 27 September 2014, he appeared in comedy play My Night With Reg at the Donmar Warehouse theatre in the West End.

As of 2016 he played Mark Craig in BBC Drama New Blood.

Notable roles

Film
All or Nothing (2002) ... Man at Bar (director: Mike Leigh)
Bollywood Queen (2001) ... Facer (director: Jeremy Wooding)

Television
  New Blood Mark Craig; 2016–present
The Coroner Detective Sergeant Davey Higgins; 2015–2016 
Doctor Who ... Al; 2014 (director: Douglas Mackinnon)
New Street Law ... Dennis Longwell; 2006 (director: David Skynner)
The Street ... Alex; 2006 (director: David Blair)
No Angels ... Peter; 2005
The Bill ... Scott Burnett; 2005
Judge John Deed ... Alan Ferns; 2004 (director: Tristram Powell)
Midsomer Murders ... Harry Rose; 2005 (director: Peter Smith)
New Tricks ... DI Tom Wilson; 2004 (director: Martyn Friend)
Family ... Inspector Mickey Fowler; 2003 (director: David Drury)
Suspicion ... DS Wilmot; 2003 (director: Jamie Payne)
Murder in Mind ... Charles Merrick; 2002 (director: Coky Giedroyc)
The Art of War ...Keith Reynolds; 2002
'Orrible ... Reuben; 2001 (director: Dominic Brigstocke)
Murphy's Law ... Johnny; 2001 (director: John Strickland)
Dirty Tricks ... Clive; 2000 (director: Paul Seed)
Pay and Display ... Daniel Weir; 2000 (director: Andy D'Emmoney)
Last Christmas ... Bobby Moore; 1999 (director: Adrian Shergold)
Kavanagh QC ... Rev. Ian Winfarthing in "Innocency of Life"; 14 April 1998(director: Ferdy Fairfax)
The Lakes ... Albie; 1997-1999 (director: David Blair)
Tom Jones ... Jack; 1997 (director: Metin Huseyin)
Deep Secrets ... Martin; 1996 (director: Diarmiud Lawrence)
Bodyguards ... DI Trevor Curran; 1995 (director: Bob Bierman)
The Adventures of Young Indiana Jones ... Carl in "Attack of the Hawkmen"; 8 October 1995 (director: Ben Burtt)
Casualty ... Terry; 1993 (director: Michael Owen Morris)
A Touch of Frost ... DC Barnard; 1992
Prime Suspect ... Jason; 1992 (director: John Strickland)
Casualty ... Jeff Collier (2007–2014)
 Doctors ... Ryan Stevens (2020)

Theatre
My Night With Reg; Donmar Warehouse, London; 17 January – 11 April 2015 (director: Robert Hastie)
The Dark ... Barnaby; Donmar Warehouse, London; 23 March – 24 April 2004 (director: Anna Mackmin)
Frame 312 ... Tom and Roy; Donmar Warehouse, London; 2002 (director: Josie Rourke)
Kick For Touch ... Joe; Crucible Theatre, London; 2002 (director: Josie Rourke)

References

External links

Matt Bardock – CV on Spotlight
HattonMcEwan.com – profile on agent's website

English male television actors
English male stage actors
Living people
1969 births
Alumni of the Guildhall School of Music and Drama